Balaiah or Balayya is a surname. Notable people with the surname include:

 Brahmanapalli Balaiah (1930–2019), Indian politician
 M. Balayya (1930–2022), Telugu film actor, writer, and director
 T. S. Balaiah (1914–1972), Tamil film actor